is a Japanese singer, television personality. She is a member of Tsuri Bit. She is nicknamed . Her colour is pink in the group. She also represents the marlin in Tsuri Bit. After being disbanded on 24 March 2019, she become an actress

Biography
On 22 May 2013, Andō debuted as a member of Tsuri Bit. They debuted with the song "Start Dash".

On 23 April 2014, a fishing centre test carried out in Tsuri Bit members Tsuri Center Kettei-hai 2014 –Hikki Shiken-hen– Hōkago wa Mini Live, shined in the second generation fishing centre. Andō served as centre at the delivery single "Go! Go! Fishing" released on 10 October (Fishing Day) the same year.

Published on 12 May 2016, she posted her swimsuit gravure within Weekly Young Jump "Sakidol Ace Survival" project.

Andō's swimsuit gravure was also posted on Weekly Playboy released on 4 July 2016.

She was inaugurated as the "Official Navigator" of @Jam Expo 2017 held at Kanagawa Yokohama Arena on 26 and 27 August. Andō will organize the same event unit Sakurano no Yume with Yumeri Abe of Super Girls and Mika Ichinose of Kamiyado from 27 May.

Filmography

Radio

Television series

Exhibitions

References

Japanese idols
2001 births
Living people